Zeri is a comune in the province of Massa and Carrara, Tuscany, central Italy. It is located in the Lunigiana traditional region.

References

External links

Official website

Cities and towns in Tuscany